Henry ("Donald") Martínez (born January 20, 1971, in San Salvador) is a retired bantamweight boxer from El Salvador, who represented his native country at the 1988 Summer Olympics in Seoul, South Korea.

Olympic results
Below is the record of Henry Martínez, an El Salvadorian light flyweight boxer who competed at the 1988 Seoul Olympics:

 Round of 64: Defeated Yacine Cheikh (Algeria) by decision, 5-0
 Round of 32: Defeated Yehuda Ben-Haim (Israel) by walkover
 Round of 16: Lost to Ivailo Khristov (Bulgaria) by decision, 0-5

Pro career
He made his professional debut on January 26, 1990. After nineteen professional bouts (16-2-1) Martínez retired from boxing after being defeated by US boxer Johnny Tapia in the fight for the vacant World Boxing Organization super flyweight title on October 12, 1994.

External links
 

1971 births
Living people
Sportspeople from San Salvador
Salvadoran male boxers
Bantamweight boxers
Boxers at the 1988 Summer Olympics
Olympic boxers of El Salvador